Chuck Berry in London is the eighth studio album by Chuck Berry, released in 1965 by Chess Records. Only eight of the tracks were actually recorded in London with the UK R&B group The 5 Dimensions, in January, 1965. Five other tracks were recorded in Chicago in December, 1964 with the Jules Blattner Group. The remaining track, "Night Beat" was left over from a 1957 session.

Track listing
All songs written by Chuck Berry except as noted

Side one
 "My Little Love-Light" – 2:38
 "She Once Was Mine" – 2:38
 "After It's Over" – 2:20
 "I Got a Booking" – 2:54
 "Night Beat" – 2:43
 "His Daughter Caroline" – 3:16
 "You Came a Long Way from St Louis" (Bob Russell, John Benson Brooks) – 2:08

Side two
 "St. Louis Blues" (W.C. Handy) – 2:39
 "Jamaica Farewell" (Lord Burgess) – 2:08
 "Dear Dad" – 1:51
 "Butterscotch" – 2:40
 "The Song of My Love" – 2:30
 "Why Should We End This Way" – 2:53
 "I Want to Be Your Driver" – 2:15

Personnel
 Chuck Berry – guitar, vocals
 Jules Blattner – guitar
 Jeff Crivet – guitar
 Louis Cennamo – bass
 Bill Bixler – bass
 Bob Scrivens – piano
 Peter John Hogman – harmonica
 Howard Jones – drums
 Chick Kattenhorn – drums
 Brian Hamilton – tenor saxophone
 Bill Armstrong – backing vocals
 Brian Smith – backing vocals
 Mike Boocock – backing vocals
 Rick Green – backing vocals
 Neil Carter – backing vocals
 Roger Eagle – backing vocals
 Roger Fairhurst – backing vocals

Charting history

Singles - Billboard (North America)

References

External links

1965 albums
Chuck Berry albums
Chess Records albums
Albums produced by Leonard Chess
Albums produced by Phil Chess